Purzand may refer to:
 Purzand-e Sofla
 Purzand-e Vosta